Brun bitter, also called Hair of the Dog, is a 1988 Norwegian crime film directed by Sølve Skagen, starring Frank Krog, Kristin Kajander and Anne Krigsvoll. The screenplay is also by Skagen, based on the book Din, til døden, by Gunnar Staalesen. The story is typical of a film noir, with the detective Alexander 'Lex' Larsen (Krog) attempting to clear the femme fatale Vigdis Wang (Kajander) of a charge of murder.

Cast
 Frank Krog as Alexander 'Lex' Larsen
 Kristin Kajander as Vigdis Wang
 Anne Krigsvoll as Liv Bredesen
 Rolf Skøien as Johnny 'Jocken'
 Vidar Sandem as Jens Falch aka Falchen
 Svein Erik Brodal as Asbjørn, videomann
 Rulle Smit as Charlotte
 Dan Kristoffer Ree as Kristoffer 'Kolumbus'
 Bjørn Floberg as Sebastian Ramberg
 Eva von Hanno as Kontordame
 Fredrik Rütter as Mikkelsen
 Morten Faldaas as Windy
 Bjarne Thomsen as Salasso
 Odd Furøy as Forhørsdommer
 Wiggo Lebsanft as Gudmund Holte
 Kine Hellebust as Astrid Holte
 Tone Schwarzott as Religiøs dame
 Siva Rita Engra Ringdal as Siarita

External links
 
 Brun bitter at Filmweb.no (Norwegian)
 Hair of the Dog at the Norwegian Film Institute

1988 films
1980s crime films
Norwegian crime drama films